Gustavo de Souza Caiche (born 4 June 1976), is a Brazilian professional football coach and former player who is the assistant coach for Athletico Paranaense U20s. He played as a centre-back.

Honours
Paraná State League: 1998, 2000, 2001
Brazilian League: 2001
Parana State Superleague: 2002
São Paulo State League: 2004

References

External links

Leão apresenta Gustavo
CBF
sportnet

1976 births
Living people
Brazilian footballers
Club Athletico Paranaense players
Sociedade Esportiva Palmeiras players
Associação Desportiva São Caetano players
Sport Club Corinthians Paulista players
Sport Club do Recife players
Association football defenders
People from São José do Rio Preto
Footballers from São Paulo (state)